Adelpha ethelda, the Ethelda sister, is a butterfly of the family Nymphalidae. It was described by William Chapman Hewitson in 1867. It is found from Mexico to Ecuador. The habitat consists of pre-montane rainforests and cloud forests at altitudes ranging from 400 to 2,000 meters.

The wingspan is 34–37 mm. Adult males have been recorded imbibing mineralised moisture from damp soil, boulders, sandy river beaches or from aphid secretions on foliage.

Larvae have been recorded feeding on Sabicea aspera.

Subspecies
A. e. ethelda (Ecuador)
A. e. eponina Staudinger, 1886 (Colombia)
A. e. galbao Brévignon, 1995 (French Guiana)
A. e. sophax Godman & Salvin, 1878 (Costa Rica, Panama)
A. e. zalmona (Hewitson, 1871) (Costa Rica, Panama, Colombia)

References

Butterflies described in 1867
Adelpha
Lepidoptera of French Guiana
Nymphalidae of South America
Taxa named by William Chapman Hewitson